Chris Yule (born March 29, 1975) is a Canadian-born Japanese former professional ice hockey player. He played in Japan with Nippon Paper Cranes of the Asia League Ice Hockey. As of the 2011–2012 ALIH season he holds the record for most goals scored by a single player in their career.

Yule, who was born in Edmonton, Alberta, competed at the 1998 Winter Olympics as a member of the Japan men's national ice hockey team. He has also played with Team Japan at the 1999, 2000, 2001, 2002, 2003, and 2004 IIHF World Championships.

References

External links

1975 births
Canadian expatriate ice hockey players in Japan
Canadian ice hockey centres
Ice hockey people from Alberta
Ice hockey players at the 1998 Winter Olympics
Japanese ice hockey players
Canadian emigrants to Japan
Kokudo Keikaku players
Living people
Melbourne Ice players
Naturalized citizens of Japan
Nippon Paper Cranes players
Olympic ice hockey players of Japan
Seibu Prince Rabbits players
Ice hockey people from Edmonton
Asian Games silver medalists for Japan
Medalists at the 1999 Asian Winter Games
Ice hockey players at the 1999 Asian Winter Games
Asian Games medalists in ice hockey